Tinicum is the name of two townships in Pennsylvania:

 Tinicum Township, Bucks County, Pennsylvania
 Tinicum Township, Delaware County, Pennsylvania

The name is also associated with the John Heinz National Wildlife Refuge at Tinicum.

 Tinicum Incorporated is a private investment firm.